Dordrecht is a railway station in Dordrecht, Netherlands located on the Breda–Rotterdam railway and the Elst–Dordrecht railway. The station was opened on 1 January 1872, when the railway line between Rotterdam and Antwerp was opened.  On 16 July 1885, the railway line from Dordrecht to Gorinchem was opened. The neo-Renaissance railway station building is located to the south of the city centre. Dordrecht is now an important railway station on the Nederlandse Spoorwegen railway network. The services to Gorinchem and Geldermalsen are operated by Arriva.

Destinations

These are some of the main destinations directly available from Dordrecht:

Rotterdam, The Hague, Leiden, Haarlem, Amsterdam Airport Schiphol, Amsterdam, Roosendaal, Middelburg, Breda, Tilburg, Eindhoven, Venlo, Gorinchem and Geldermalsen.

Train services
The stations is served by the following services:

1x per hour international service Amsterdam - Schiphol - The Hague - Rotterdam - Dordrecht - Roosendaal - Antwerp - Brussels Airport - Brussels (Until April 8, 2018)
2x per hour intercity service Lelystad - Almere - Duivendrecht - Amsterdam Zuid - Schiphol - Leiden - The Hague - Rotterdam - Dordrecht
2x per hour intercity service Amsterdam - Haarlem - Leiden - The Hague - Rotterdam - Dordrecht - Roosendaal - Vlissingen
1x per hour intercity service Dordrecht - Breda (Not evenings and weekends)
1x per hour night service (nachtnet) Rotterdam - Dordrecht - Breda - Eindhoven (weekends only)
4x per hour local service (sprinter) The Hague - Rotterdam - Dordrecht (2x per hour on evenings and weekends)
2x per hour local service (sprinter) Dordrecht - Roosendaal (1x per hour on evenings and weekends)
2x per hour local service (sprinter) Dordrecht - Breda - Tilburg - 's-Hertogenbosch
2x per hour local services (stoptrein) Dordrecht - Gorinchem - Geldermalsen
2x per hour local services (stoptrein) Dordrecht - Gorinchem

As of April 9, 2018 the international service Amsterdam - Brussels will be running on the HSL-Zuid with a stop at Breda and does not call at Dordrecht and Roosendaal anymore. Passengers for Belgium can take a train to Breda and change trains there.

Bus services

Dordrecht is served by city bus services (stadsbussen) as well as regional bus services (streekbussen).

Stadsbussen

There are 8 city bus lines, which are operated by Arriva. From the railway station the city bus lines provides services to/from:

 Centrum (downtown area)
 Stadskantoor (City Hall)
 Ziekenhuis Dordwijk (Hospital)
 Ziekenhuis Amstelwijck (Hospital)
 Stadspolders railway station
 Zuid railway station
 The ferry terminals at Papendrechtse Veer
 The neighbourhoods Crabbehof, Dubbeldam, Het Reeland, Krispijn, Leerpark, Merwedepolder, Noordflank, Oudelandshoek, Staart, Stadspolders, Sterrenburg, Wielwijk and Zuidhoven
 The industrial areas Amstelwijck and West

The routes of the city buses are as follows:

Streekbussen

The regional bus lines provides services to/from:

 Centrum (downtown area)
 Stadskantoor (City Hall)
 Ziekenhuis Dordwijk (Hospital)
 Ziekenhuis Amstelwijck (Hospital)
 Biesbosch National Park
 The neighbourhoods Het Reeland, Krispijn, Leerpark, Staart and Wielwijk
 The industrial area West
 The nearby cities and towns Alblasserdam, Barendrecht, Hardinxveld-Giessendam, Hendrik Ido Ambacht, Papendrecht, Ridderkerk, Rotterdam, Sliedrecht and Zwijndrecht
 The city of Utrecht
 Villages around Dordrecht

The routes of the regional buses, serving Dordrecht, are as follows:

External links
NS website 
Dutch Public Transport journey planner 

Railway stations in Dordrecht
Railway stations opened in 1872
Railway stations on the Merwede-Lingelijn
Railway stations on the Staatslijn I